"Cliffs of Dover" is an instrumental composition by guitarist Eric Johnson which appeared on his 1990 Ah Via Musicom album although the song had frequently been played live by Johnson as early as 1984. The album version of the song is composed in the key of G major. The song was played with a Gibson ES-335 (as well as a Fender Stratocaster) through a B. K. Butler Tube Driver and an Echoplex plugged into a 100-watt Marshall amplifier. The song takes its name from the White Cliffs of Dover, an extensive and visually stunning chalk outcrop that runs along the southeast coast of England. It is also featured on the video game Guitar Hero III and is available as DLC for the game Rocksmith 2014.

Song structure 

"Cliffs of Dover" begins with an ad-libbed electric guitar solo, using techniques such as string skipping and hybrid picking. In the solo intro, Johnson does not adhere to any distinct time signature. Drums are then added as the song settles into a  rhythmic shuffle verse accompanied by a very accessible set of melodies that, throughout the song intro, feature variations (octavations for example) on the main chorus.

The outro or coda then recalls the freestyle mood and timing of the ad-libbed intro.

While he did indeed compose "Cliffs of Dover", Johnson does not take full credit, saying "I don't even know if I can take credit for writing 'Cliffs of Dover' ... it was just there for me one day ... literally wrote in five minutes ... kind of a gift from a higher place that all of us are eligible for. We just have to listen for it and be available to receive it."

Equipment used 

Johnson has stated that the guitar he used in the intro before the band kicks in is a 1954 Strat (possibly "Virginia"). When the band comes, the guitar is a stop-tail Gibson ES-335 (either a 1963 or 1964) until the solo. The first part of the solo Johnson recorded with ES-335 was no good, so he cut it out and recorded the Stratocaster with a 1980s Tube Driver in its place. Halfway through the solo, around 3:03, there is a noticeable change in tone when the guitar switches back to the original Gibson lead track. He got playful remarks about it from engineer Richard Mullen, saying "You can't do that!" but it was agreed that it sounded like Johnson simply enabled an effect pedal halfway through the solo.

Accolades 

"Cliffs of Dover" was voted number 17 in Guitar World magazine's list of 100 Greatest Guitar Solos, placing it between 16, "Heartbreaker" (by Led Zeppelin) and 18 "Little Wing" (by The Jimi Hendrix Experience).

In 1992, "Cliffs of Dover" won a Grammy Award for Best Rock Instrumental Performance, beating the Allman Brothers Band ("Kind of Bird"), Danny Gatton ("Elmira Street Boogie"), Rush ("Where's My Thing?"), and Yes ("Masquerade").

References

1990 songs
Eric Johnson songs
Grammy Award for Best Rock Instrumental Performance
Rock instrumentals
Songs about England
1990s instrumentals